The Roman Catholic Diocese of Pinheiro is a diocese located in the city of Pinheiro in the Ecclesiastical province of São Luís do Maranhão in Brazil.

History
 22 July 1939: Established as Territorial Prelature of Pinheiro from the Territorial Prelature of São José do Grajaú and Metropolitan Archdiocese of São Luís do Maranhão
 16 October 1979: Promoted as Diocese of Pinheiro

Bishops
Apostolic Administrator 
Carlos Carmelo de Vasconcellos Motta † (1940 - 1944) Archbishop of São Luís do Maranhão
Prelates of Pinheiro (Roman Rite)
José Maria Lemerder † (1944 - 1946) Died
Alfonso Maria Ungarelli, M.S.C. † (13 Nov 1948 - 1 Mar 1975) Retired
Carmelo Cassati, M.S.C. (17 Jun 1975 - 12 Feb 1979) Appointed, Bishop of Tricarico
Ricardo Pedro Paglia, M.S.C. (3 Jul 1979 - 16 Oct 1979)  Appointed Bishop here
Bishops of Pinheiro (Roman rite)
Ricardo Pedro Paglia, M.S.C. (16 Oct 1979 – 17 Oct 2012) Retired
Elio Rama, I.M.C. (17 Oct 2012–present)

Auxiliary bishops
Guido Maria Casullo (1963-1965), appointed Prelate of Cândido Mendes, Maranhão
Carmelo Cassati, M.S.C. (1970-1975), appointed Prelate here

References
 GCatholic.org
 Catholic Hierarchy

Roman Catholic dioceses in Brazil
Christian organizations established in 1939
Pinheiro, Roman Catholic Diocese of
Roman Catholic dioceses and prelatures established in the 20th century
1939 establishments in Brazil